Angel-Warrior Monument is a monument dedicated to Czechs and Slovaks, who were taken prisoner during World War I and Russian Civil War. It is situated in the city of Taganrog, Rostov Oblast, Russia at Taganrog Old Cemetery.

Description 
In 1918, 1700 Czechs and Slovaks who were captured during the First World War, worked at the Russian-Baltic Plant (Combine Plant, JSC) in Taganrog. A large number of these workers died during the Civil War, fighting on the side of Bolsheviks. To honor their memory, in 1927 a monument made of red sandstone was erected on the project of J. Navrat. Above the gravestone, there is the sculpture of an Angel warrior. One of his wings is broken, and with the other one he tries to cover the grave of his fallen comrades. The sculptor wanted to express pride in those who set foot in battle.

On the pedestal are engraved words in Russian and Czech:

This text, written in the style of revolutionary Romanticism, however, has only been partially preserved. The fragment of the angel-warrior's head is lost: soft sandstone slowly collapses when snow melts after winter. The monument was temporarily preserved with cement milk, because of what the color was distorted, so an urgent restoration work is necessary.

As of 2009, almost nothing remained out of the conservation layer, so the monument was painted by enthusiasts with façade paint in pink-beige color. In 2010 and subsequent years it was repainted in white. In the spring of 2016, on the site of the Russian part of the epitaph, a black marble slab was installed with a replica of the text.

References 

1927 establishments in Russia
Monuments and memorials in Taganrog